The Elliot Lake Standard is a weekly newspaper, published in Elliot Lake, Ontario. Owned by Postmedia, the paper publishes each Thursday and serves much of the North Shore region, including Iron Bridge, Blind River, Spanish and Sables-Spanish Rivers.

The paper was first published in the 1880s on St. Joseph Island, as the St. Joseph Island Herald. Following the emergence of Elliot Lake as the region's principal community in the 1950s, the paper moved to the city and became the Elliot Lake Standard in 1957.

See also
List of newspapers in Canada

External links
Elliot Lake Standard

Postmedia Network publications
Weekly newspapers published in Ontario
Elliot Lake
Publications with year of establishment missing